Wally Carr (11 August 1954 – 13 April 2019) was an Australian professional boxer. A Wiradjuri man who was born and raised in Wellington, New South Wales, Carr held twelve titles across six different divisions across his 15-year career as a boxer. He was nicknamed "Wait-awhile-Wal".

Described by Boxing 1970–1980 as having "boxing ability to burn" and "outstanding skills",  Wally Carr had 100 professional fights.  His first fight was in South Sydney Leagues Club in 1971 at the age of 17 and his last fight was in 1986 at the age of 32 when he announced his retirement after fighting Doug Sam at the Bruce Stadium in Canberra.

With over twelve fights overseas in countries including, Zambia, New Zealand, Indonesia, Papua New Guinea and Fiji, Wally Carr got his first crack at a world champion, his 96th fight, when he fought Korean Super-Middleweight, Chong-Pal Park, the then current IBF's world Super-Middleweight champion, in Seoul in 1984. Wally lost on points. Despite Pal Park being a world champion, this fight was not a world title bout but a ten-round non-title fight. Had Carr won, he may have received a rematch with the world title at stake then.

Wally's fighting career spanned Super-Bantamweight to Heavyweight. He fought in 13 divisions, starting out at 8 stone 10 lbs and finishing up at 14 stone 10 lbs. His titles include NSW Welterweight Champion, Australasian Light Middleweight Champion, Australian Junior Middleweight Champion, Australian Middleweight Champion, Commonwealth (British Empire) Middleweight Champion, Australian Super-Middleweight Champion, Australian Light-Heavyweight Champion and Oriental Middleweight Champion.

In 2010 Gaele Sobott published the biography of Wally Carr titled My Longest Round, which details his life from his earliest memories in Wellington, his boxing career, his battle with alcoholism, drug abuse, homelessness, and his final transition to sobriety and happiness. The book was written in close collaboration with Wally Carr over the course of six years.

Carr was selected as the inductee into the 2010 Australian National Boxing Hall of Fame Moderns category in recognition of his achievements.

Professional boxing record

Personal life 
Wally Carr was born two months after his father died by suicide by gunshot to the head.

Carr had four children (three daughters and one son) and two grandchildren. He was the grandfather of NRL player Josh Addo-Carr.

Death 
Wally Carr died on 13 April 2019 due to stomach cancer.

Legacy 
During the indigenous round of the 2020 NRL Season, Carr's name was included on the inside of the collar on the player jersey for the Melbourne Storm, for whom Carr's grandson, Josh Addo-Carr plays.

Professional boxing titles
Australia – New South Wales State welterweight title (146 Ibs)
Australasian Super Welterweight Title (154 Ibs)
Australian super welterweight title (154 Ibs)
Australian middleweight title (160 Ibs)
Australian light heavyweight title (172 Ibs)

References

1954 births
2019 deaths
Australian male boxers
Deaths from cancer in New South Wales
Deaths from stomach cancer
Indigenous Australian boxers
Sportsmen from New South Wales